Thomas John Norton (born April 26, 1950) is a former professional baseball relief pitcher who played for the Minnesota Twins of Major League Baseball (MLB) in its 1972 season.

External links
, or Retrosheet

1950 births
Living people
Alacranes de Durango players
American expatriate baseball players in Mexico
Auburn Twins players
Baseball players from Ohio
Charlotte Hornets (baseball) players
Knoxville Sox players
Major League Baseball pitchers
Mexican League baseball pitchers
Minnesota Twins players
Orlando Twins players
People from Elyria, Ohio
Sportspeople from Greater Cleveland
St. Cloud Rox players
Tacoma Twins players